George Hamilton may refer to:

Arts and entertainment
 George Hamilton IV (1937–2014), American country music performer
 George Hamilton (actor) (born 1939), American actor
 George Hamilton (musician) (1901–1957), father of the actor George Hamilton
 George Hamilton (Resident Evil), fictional character in the video games Resident Outbreak File #1 and File #2
 George Heard Hamilton (1910–2004), professor of art history at Yale University
 George Rostrevor Hamilton (1888–1967), English poet and critic

Military
 Sir George Hamilton, Comte Hamilton (est. 1635 – 1676), Irish soldier in French service
 George Hamilton (soldier) (aft. 1658 – aft. 1728), Scottish soldier, Member of Parliament for Anstruther Burghs, and Jacobite
 George FitzGeorge Hamilton (1898–1918), British Army officer

Politics

U.K.
 Sir George Hamilton, 1st Baronet, of Donalong (c. 1607–1679), Irish baronet
 George Hamilton, 3rd Earl of Abercorn (c. 1636 – bef. 1683), Scottish nobleman
 George Hamilton, 4th Baron Hamilton of Strabane (1636/7 – 1668), Irish peer
 George Hamilton, 1st Earl of Orkney (1666–1737)
 George Hamilton (MP for Wells) (c. 1697–1775), Member of Parliament for Wells and for St Johnstown, Donegal
 George Hamilton (1732–1793), MP for Belfast
 George Hamilton (1732–1796), MP for Augher
 George Hamilton-Gordon, 4th Earl of Aberdeen (1784–1860), Prime Minister of the United Kingdom in 1852–1855
 George Alexander Hamilton (1802–1871), British politician and civil servant
 George Baillie-Hamilton, 10th Earl of Haddington (1802–1870), British politician
 Lord George Hamilton (1845–1927), British politician
 Sir George Hamilton, 1st Baronet (1877–1947) of Ilford, British politician
 George Douglas-Hamilton, 10th Earl of Selkirk (1906–1994), Scottish nobleman and politician

Other political figures
 George Hamilton (city founder) (1788–1836), Canadian politician and founder of Hamilton, Ontario
 George Wellesley Hamilton (1846–1915), Canadian politician

Sports
 George Hamilton (footballer) (1917–2001), Scottish footballer
 George Hamilton (broadcaster) (born 1951), association football commentator with RTÉ
 Eppie Hamilton (George Hamilton, born 1900), American baseball player

Religion
 George Hamilton (moderator) (1635–1712), moderator of the General Assembly of the Church of Scotland in 1699
 George Hamilton (canon) (1718–1787), Canon of Windsor
 George Hamilton (priest) (1823–1905), Archdeacon of Lindisfarne and of Northumberland

Other
 George Hamilton (lumber baron) (1781–1839), lumber baron in the Ottawa Valley
 George Ernest Hamilton (1800–1872), English civil engineer in South Australia
 George Hamilton (Australian police officer) (1812–1883), senior South Australian police commissioner
 George Douglas Hamilton (1835–1911), New Zealand run holder and station manager
 George Henry Hamilton (1875–1948), president of the Federal Reserve Bank of Kansas City
 George Hamilton (police officer) (born 1967), Chief Constable of the Police Service of Northern Ireland from 2014